John McFarlane (born 24 December 1905) was a Scottish footballer who played as a striker.

References

External links
 LFC History profile

1905 births
Year of death missing
Scottish footballers
Liverpool F.C. players
Shawfield F.C. players
Aberdeen F.C. players
Halifax Town A.F.C. players
Northampton Town F.C. players
Kidderminster Harriers F.C. players
Darlington F.C. players
Worcester City F.C. players
Bath City F.C. players
Footballers from Glasgow
Scottish Junior Football Association players
Scottish Football League players
English Football League players
Southern Football League players
Association football forwards